Stork B.V. is a Dutch manufacturing and services company with headquarters in Utrecht.

Stork Technical Services is a supplier of integrated technical services for installations and machines in the industrial market. The group, which consists of the Industry Services and Industry Specialists strategic units, achieved a turnover of €1,089 million in 2007 with 9,320 employees. Stork Technical Services was sold by to the buyer American engineering and construction company, paid 260.2 Million euro. After the deal, Fluor joined its own Operations & Maintenance division of 4000 employees with Stork. The enlarged Stork will then have 19,000 employees and a turnover of 2,1 billion euro.

History 
Stork was founded in 1868 by Charles Theodorus Stork. In 1954 it merged with Werkspoor, founded in 1827. In 1996 Stork acquired the healthy parts of Fokker, creating a new division. By 2007 Stork had four divisions:
 Textile print machines (Stork Prints) sold in 2007
 Poultry slaughter machines (Stork Food Systems)
 Aerospace and space technology (Fokker Aerospace Group)
 Technical services (Stork Industry Services)

The company agreed to a €1.5 billion takeover by a consortium led by the British buyout firm Candover on 28 November 2007. As part of the deal, Stork's food systems unit was sold on in May 2008 to Marel Food Systems, an Icelandic firm controlled by Landsbanki Íslands and Eyrir Invest. The consortium delisted Stork from the Amsterdam Stock Exchange on 19 February 2008, having obtained around 98% of the company's shares by mid-January.

On 24 November 2010, Stork BV announced the sale of their Materials and Testing group to 3i Group plc.

In 2012 the last remaining divisions Fokker Technologies and Stork Technical Services became independent of each other. In 2015 Fokker Technologies was spun of into GKN Aerospace.

References

External links

Official website

Companies based in North Holland
Facilities engineering companies
Fokker
Rolling stock manufacturers of the Netherlands
Gooise Meren
Hengelo